The Women's High Jump event at the 1980 Summer Olympics in Moscow, Soviet Union had an entry list of 20 competitors. The final was held on Saturday 1980-07-26. Sara Simeoni took gold in the event, Urszula Kielan won silver, and Jutta Kirst won bronze.

Medalists

Results

Qualification
Held on Friday July 25, 1980

Final
Held on Saturday July 26, 1980

See also
 1976 Women's Olympic High Jump (Montreal)
 1978 Women's European Championships High Jump (Prague)
 1982 Women's European Championships High Jump (Athens)
 1983 Women's World Championships High Jump (Helsinki)
 1984 Women's Olympic High Jump (Los Angeles)
 1984 Women's Friendship Games High Jump (Prague)
 1986 Women's European Championships High Jump (Stuttgart)
 1987 Women's World Championships High Jump (Rome)

References

External links
 Results

H
High jump at the Olympics
1980 in women's athletics
Women's events at the 1980 Summer Olympics